The Abrolhos Archipelago are a group of 5 small islands with coral reefs off the southern coast of Bahia state in the northeast of Brazil, between 17º25’—18º09’ S and 38º33’—39º05’ W. Caravelas is the nearest town. There is a conspicuous shipwreck in the group, SS Rosalinda.

History
These islets were surveyed by  Baron Roussin. As part of the instructions for the second survey voyage of HMS Beagle, the Admiralty noted "the great importance of knowing the true position of the Abrolhos Banks, and the certainty that they extend much further out than the limits assigned to them by Baron Roussin", and asked Captain Robert FitzRoy to take soundings and establish the position of the reefs. The work was carried out from 27 to 30 March 1832, giving Charles Darwin the opportunity to examine the wildlife and geology of the islands.

Known to the Royal Navy in the First World War as the Abrolhos Rocks, the area was used as a refuelling point (coal) during Doveton Sturdee's operations against the German cruisers of Admiral Von Spee in late 1914. This operation ended with the Battle of the Falklands and the subsequent sinking of the only survivor, SMS Dresden.

Features

Islands
Ilha de Santa Bárbara, the largest island. There is a Brazilian Navy military outpost and a lighthouse.
Ilha Siriba, the only island open to visitors
Ilha Redonda
Ilha Guarita
Ilha Sueste

Submerged banks
Parcel dos Abrolhos, a large submerged reef extending from north to south east of the archipelago. Located  to the east of Santa Barbara Island, its limits are not well defined.
Parcel das Paredes, located to the northwest of the archipelago and the largest feature of the wider Abrolhos.
Sebastiao Gomes Reef, Coroa Vermelha Reef and Viçosa Reef, located to the southwest of the Parcel das Paredes.
Timbebas Reef, located to the north near the coast.

Wildlife
The extensive reefs of the island group are an area of rich marine fauna. The uninhabited islets are a breeding ground for pelagic birds.

The Abrolhos Marine National Park is a Marine Park located in the Abrolhos Archipelago since 1983. It is strictly forbidden to disembark on Ilha Guarita and Ilha Suest.

Gallery

See also
 List of lighthouses in Brazil
Placer (geography)

Notes

References

External links

Satellite photo (Google)
Abrolhos Isle Portal
Abrolhos - The South Atlantic Largest Coral Reef Complex
  Centro de Sinalização Náutica Almirante Moraes Rego
 ABROLHOS (en espanhol)

Landforms of Bahia
Archipelagoes of the Atlantic Ocean
Islands of the South Atlantic Ocean
Protected areas of Bahia
Archipelagoes of Brazil
Uninhabited islands of Brazil
Lighthouses in Brazil